Västerås SK is a Swedish football club based in Västerås. The club was formed on 29 January 1904.

Season to season

* League restructuring in 2006 resulted in a new division being created at Tier 3 and subsequent divisions dropping a level.

Players

Out on loan

Retired number(s)

Attendances
In recent seasons Västerås SK FK have had the following average attendances:

Achievements
 Division 1 Norra:
 Winners (3): 1996, 2010, 2018

References

External links
 Västerås SK – official site
 När himlen är grönvit – supporter site
 Fanatics – supporter site
 Västerås SK at svenskafans.com – supporter site

 
Football clubs in Västmanland County
Allsvenskan clubs
Sport in Västmanland County
Association football clubs established in 1904
1904 establishments in Sweden